FC Molodechno is a Belarusian football club based in Molodechno. They play in the Belarusian First League, the 2nd division in Belarusian football. Their home stadium is Molodechno City Stadium.

History

Early history
The city of Molodechno was represented in the Belarusian SSR League since 1949 by various teams attached to local industries and organizations and thus having different names and loose continuity: Dinamo Molodechno (1949–1955), Molodechno Oblast team (1956, 1959), Molodechno city team (1957–1958), Spartak Molodechno (1960–1963, 1970–1971), Naroch Molodechno (1964–1965), Krasnoye Znamya Molodechno (1966), Volna Molodecno (1967–1969), Selena Molodechno (1972–1980), Metallist Molodechno (1981–1982), Trud Molodechno (1983–1985), Stankostroitel Molodechno (1986). Spartak Molodechno won the Belarusian SSR league in 1963. The modern FC Molodechno logo retroactively displays 1949 as the club's year of foundation.

Modern club
Metallurg Molodechno was formed in 1989 and in 1991, the young team won the Belarusian SSR Top League championship as well as the Soviet Amateur Cup. Since 1992, the team started playing in the Belarusian Premier League. In 1993, they were renamed to FC Molodechno. Their best result came in the 1994–95 season, when Molodechno finished 4th. In 1999, they finished 15th and relegated to the First League, but after winning the First League in 2000, they quickly came back to the top level in 2001. To celebrate the win, they changed their name to Molodechno-2000. They finished last and relegated to the First League again in 2003 and went further down to the Second League one season later. In 2006, they changed their name back to Molodechno. In 2011, the name was changed to Zabudova Molodechno after a merger with Zabudova Chist. In 2013, the merger was dissolved and the club was renamed to Molodechno-2013 and later to Molodechno-DYuSSh-4 in 2015. The club changed its name again in 2019 back to FC Molodechno.

Name changes
1989: FC Metallurg Molodechno
1993: FC Molodechno
2001: FC Molodechno-2000
2006: FC Molodechno
2011: FC Zabudova Molodechno
2013: FC Molodechno-2013
2015: FC Molodechno-DYuSSh-4
2019: FC Molodechno

Achievements 
SSR Belarusian League: 1
 1991
Soviet Amateur Cup: 1
 1991

Current squad 
As of March 2023

League and Cup history 

1 Withdrew from the First League due to financial troubles.

References

External links 

Association football clubs established in 1949
Association football clubs established in 1989
Molodechno
1989 establishments in Belarus